Westcliffe is a village near Dover in east Kent, England. The population of the village is included in the civil parish of St. Margaret-at-Cliffe. An alternative spelling is West Cliffe, used on Ordnance Survey maps.

External links

Villages in Kent
Dover District